Gilley's Urban Cowboy Band is Mickey Gilley's band. In 1981, the Gilley's Urban Cowboy Band won its first and only Grammy. The Gilley's Urban Cowboy Band performs in Branson, Missouri, with Mickey Gilley at the Mickey Gilley Theatre.

The original Urban Cowboy Band at Gilley's consisted of Bobbe Brown, drums bass and guitar Tabby Crabb, piano and guitar; Rocky Stone, guitar, Damon Stephens, lead guitar and keyboardist, Ron Levine, fiddle, piano and band leader; Sidney Pomonis, bass and bus driver; J. B. Van, pedal steel guitar; Mike schillaci, drums; Norman Carlson, saxophone, keyboards and of course Mickey Gilley and Johnny Lee.

Tabby Crabb died April 18, 2011, of cancer at his home with his wife Gloria by his side.

References 

American country music groups
Grammy Award winners